Galessus or Galessos was an ancient town on the island of Syros.

Its site is located near Galissas.

References

Populated places in the ancient Aegean islands
Former populated places in Greece
Syros